Daniel Benítez (born November 13, 1979 in Mariano Roque Alonso) is a Paraguayan footballer who played as a defender for Guabirá of the Primera División in Bolivia.

Teams
 Rubio Ñú 2006
 General Díaz 2007
 Central Norte 2007–2008
 Imbabura 2008
 LDU Loja 2009
 Guabirá 2010–2011

External links
 
 

1979 births
Living people
People from Mariano Roque Alonso
Paraguayan footballers
Association football defenders
Imbabura S.C. footballers
L.D.U. Loja footballers
Guabirá players
Paraguayan expatriate footballers
Expatriate footballers in Argentina
Expatriate footballers in Bolivia
Expatriate footballers in Ecuador